Marquette Township is a civil township of Mackinac County in the U.S. state of Michigan. The population was 603 at the 2010 census.

Geography

Demographics
As of the census of 2000, there were 659 people, 251 households, and 190 families residing in the township.  The population density was 6.8 per square mile (2.6/km2).  There were 467 housing units at an average density of 4.8 per square mile (1.9/km2).  The racial makeup of the township was 90.14% White, 6.98% Native American, 0.30% Asian, and 2.58% from two or more races. Hispanic or Latino of any race were 0.91% of the population.

There were 251 households, out of which 33.5% had children under the age of 18 living with them, 68.1% were married couples living together, 2.8% had a female householder with no husband present, and 24.3% were non-families. 22.3% of all households were made up of individuals, and 9.2% had someone living alone who was 65 years of age or older.  The average household size was 2.63 and the average family size was 3.06.

In the township the population was spread out, with 28.2% under the age of 18, 6.5% from 18 to 24, 24.6% from 25 to 44, 24.3% from 45 to 64, and 16.4% who were 65 years of age or older.  The median age was 38 years. For every 100 females, there were 107.9 males.  For every 100 females age 18 and over, there were 106.6 males.

The median income for a household in the township was $30,069, and the median income for a family was $33,929. Males had a median income of $29,375 versus $18,750 for females. The per capita income for the township was $14,538.  About 11.3% of families and 11.8% of the population were below the poverty line, including 12.0% of those under age 18 and 7.6% of those age 65 or over.

References

Townships in Mackinac County, Michigan
Townships in Michigan
Populated places on Lake Huron in the United States